Baghcheh (also Romanized as Bāghcheh; also known as Bāghīcheh) is a village in Sangestan Rural District, in the Central District of Hamadan County, Hamadan Province, Iran. At the 2006 census, its population was 297, in 64 families.

References 

Populated places in Hamadan County